Horner's syndrome, also known as oculosympathetic paresis, is a combination of symptoms that arises when a group of nerves known as the sympathetic trunk is damaged. The signs and symptoms occur on the same side (ipsilateral) as it is a lesion of the sympathetic trunk. It is characterized by miosis (a constricted pupil), partial ptosis (a weak, droopy eyelid), apparent anhidrosis (decreased sweating), with apparent enophthalmos (inset eyeball).

The nerves of the sympathetic trunk arise from the spinal cord in the chest, and from there ascend to the neck and face. The nerves are part of the sympathetic nervous system, a division of the autonomic (or involuntary) nervous system. Once the syndrome has been recognized, medical imaging and response to particular eye drops may be required to identify the location of the problem and the underlying cause.

Signs and symptoms
Signs that are found in people with Horner's syndrome on the affected side of the face include the following:
 ptosis (drooping of the upper eyelid)
 anhidrosis (decreased sweating)
 miosis (constriction of the pupil)
 Enophthalmos (sinking of the eyeball into the face)
 inability to completely close or open the eyelid
 facial flushing
 headaches
 loss of ciliospinal reflex
 bloodshot conjunctiva, depending on the site of lesion.
 unilateral straight hair (in congenital Horner's syndrome); the hair on the affected side may be straight in some cases.
 heterochromia iridum (in congenital Horner's syndrome)

Interruption of sympathetic pathways leads to several implications. It inactivates the dilator muscle and thereby produces miosis. It inactivates the superior tarsal muscle which produces ptosis. It reduces sweat secretion in the face. Patients may have apparent enophthalmos (affected eye looks to be slightly sunken in) but this is not always the case. The ptosis from inactivation of the superior tarsal muscle causes the eye to appear sunken in, but when actually measured, enophthalmos is not present. The phenomenon of enophthalmos is seen in Horner's syndrome in cats, rats, and dogs.

Sometimes there is flushing on the affected side of the face due to dilation of blood vessels under the skin.  The pupil's light reflex is maintained as this is controlled via the parasympathetic nervous system.

In children, Horner's syndrome sometimes leads to heterochromia, a difference in eye color between the two eyes. This happens because a lack of sympathetic stimulation in childhood interferes with melanin pigmentation of the melanocytes in the superficial stroma of the iris.

In veterinary medicine, signs can include partial closure of the third eyelid, or nictitating membrane.

Causes

Horner's syndrome is usually acquired as a result of disease, but may also be congenital (inborn, associated with heterochromatic iris) or iatrogenic (caused by medical treatment). In rare cases, Horner's syndrome may be the result of repeated, minor head trauma, such as being hit with a soccer ball.  Although most causes are relatively benign, Horner's syndrome may reflect serious disease in the neck or chest (such as a Pancoast tumor (tumor in the apex of the lung) or thyrocervical venous dilatation).

Causes can be divided according to the presence and location of anhidrosis:
 Central (anhidrosis of face, arm and trunk)
 Syringomyelia
 Multiple sclerosis
 Encephalitis
 Brain tumors
 Lateral medullary syndrome
 Preganglionic (anhidrosis of face)
 Cervical rib traction on stellate ganglion
 Thyroid carcinoma
 Thyroidectomy
 Goiter
 Bronchogenic carcinoma of the superior fissure (Pancoast tumor) on apex of lung
 Klumpke paralysis
 Trauma - base of neck, usually blunt trauma, sometimes surgery.
 As a complication of tube thoracostomy
 Thoracic aortic aneurysm
 Postganglionic (no anhidrosis)
 Cluster headache - combination termed Horton's headache
 An episode of Horner's syndrome may occur during a migraine attack and be relieved afterwards
 Carotid artery dissection/carotid artery aneurysm/trauma
 Cavernous sinus thrombosis
 Middle ear infection
 Sympathectomy
 Nerve blocks, such as cervical plexus block, stellate ganglion or interscalene block

Pathophysiology 
Horner syndrome is due to a deficiency of sympathetic activity.
The site of lesion to the sympathetic outflow is on the ipsilateral side of the symptoms.
The following are examples of conditions that cause the clinical appearance of Horner's syndrome:
 First-order neuron disorder: Central lesions that involve the hypothalamospinal tract (e.g. transection of the cervical spinal cord).
 Second-order neuron disorder: Preganglionic lesions (e.g. compression of the sympathetic chain by a lung tumor) that releases acetylcholine.
 Third-order neuron disorder: Postganglionic lesions at the level of the internal carotid artery (e.g. a tumor in the cavernous sinus or a carotid artery dissection) that releases norepinephrine.
 Partial Horner's syndrome: In case of a third-neuron disorder, anhidrosis is limited to the middle part of the forehead or can be absent, resulting in a partial Horner's syndrome.

If patients have impaired sweating above the waist affecting only one side of the body, and they  do not have clinically apparent Horner's syndrome, then their lesions are just below the stellate ganglion in the sympathetic chain.

Diagnosis

Three tests are useful in confirming the presence and severity of Horner syndrome:
 Cocaine drop test: Cocaine eyedrops block the reuptake of post-ganglionic norepinephrine resulting in the dilation of a normal pupil from retention of norepinephrine in the synapse. However, in Horner's syndrome the lack of norepinephrine in the synaptic cleft causes mydriatic failure.  A more recently introduced approach that is more dependable and obviates the difficulties in obtaining cocaine is to apply the alpha-agonist apraclonidine to both eyes and observe the increased mydriatic effect (due to hypersensitivity) on the affected side of Horner syndrome (the opposite effect to what the cocaine test would produce in the presence of Horner's).
 Paredrine test: This test helps to localize the cause of the miosis. If the third order neuron (the last of three neurons in the pathway which ultimately discharges norepinephrine into the synaptic cleft) is intact, then the amphetamine causes neurotransmitter vesicle release, thus releasing norepinephrine into the synaptic cleft and resulting in robust mydriasis of the affected pupil. If the lesion itself is of the third order neuron, then the amphetamine will have no effect and the pupil remains constricted. There is no pharmacological test to differentiate between a first and second order neuron lesion.
 Dilation lag test

It is important to distinguish the ptosis caused by Horner's syndrome from the ptosis caused by a lesion to the oculomotor nerve. In the former, the ptosis occurs with a constricted pupil (due to a loss of sympathetics to the eye), whereas in the latter, the ptosis occurs with a dilated pupil (due to a loss of innervation to the sphincter pupillae).  In a clinical setting, these two ptoses are fairly easy to distinguish.  In addition to the blown pupil in a CNIII (oculomotor nerve) lesion, this ptosis is much more severe, occasionally occluding the whole eye.  The ptosis of Horner syndrome can be quite mild or barely noticeable (partial ptosis).

When anisocoria occurs and the examiner is unsure whether the abnormal pupil is the constricted or dilated one, if a one-sided ptosis is present then the abnormally sized pupil can be presumed to be on the side of the ptosis.

History
The syndrome is named after Johann Friedrich Horner, the Swiss ophthalmologist who first described the syndrome in 1869. Several others had previously described cases, but "Horner's syndrome" is most prevalent. In France and Italy, Claude Bernard is also eponymized with the condition (Claude Bernard–Horner syndrome, abbreviated CBH). In France, Francois Pourfour du Petit is also credited with describing this syndrome.

Children 
The most common causes in young children are birth trauma and a type of cancer called neuroblastoma.  The cause of about a third of cases in children is unknown.

See also 
 Anisocoria
 Harlequin syndrome

References

External links 

Peripheral nervous system disorders
Eye diseases
Syndromes affecting the nervous system
Syndromes affecting the eye
Human pupil